At War with the Mystics is the eleventh studio album by American rock band the Flaming Lips, released on April 3, 2006 by Warner Bros. Records. The album is more guitar-driven and features more politically themed lyrics than the band's previous two albums The Soft Bulletin (1999) and Yoshimi Battles the Pink Robots (2002).

At War with the Mystics won a 2006 Grammy Award for Best Rock Instrumental Performance and Best Engineered Album, Non-Classical, and was also nominated for Best Alternative Album. By 2009, the album had sold over 220,000 copies in United States, according to Nielsen SoundScan.

Track listing

5.1 audio mix
Like The Soft Bulletin and Yoshimi, At War with the Mystics was released as a special edition 5.1 CD+DVD-Audio mix on October 24, 2006, accompanied by studio outtakes, videos, and exclusive radio sessions.

Outtakes

Radio sessions

Videos

Personnel
The Flaming Lips
 Wayne Coyne – vocals, guitars, keyboards, mixing, production
 Steven Drozd – guitars, bass, keyboards, drums, vocals, mixing, production
 Michael Ivins – bass, keyboards, backing vocals, mixing, production, additional engineering
 Kliph Scurlock – drums, percussion

Additional personnel
 Scott Booker – production
 Dave Fridmann – additional songwriting, production, mixing, programming, engineering, mastering
 Greg Kurstin – additional songwriting, production, backing vocals and instruments on "Haven't Got a Clue"

Charts

Weekly charts

Year-end charts

References

External links
 

2006 albums
Albums produced by Dave Fridmann
Albums produced by Greg Kurstin
The Flaming Lips albums
Pompeii in popular culture
Warner Records albums
Albums recorded at Tarbox Road Studios
Grammy Award for Best Engineered Album, Non-Classical